St Mark's Church is in Knutsford Road in the village of Antrobus, Cheshire, England.  It is an active Anglican parish church in the deanery of Great Budworth, the archdeaconry of Chester, and the diocese of Chester. Its incumbent is shared with St Mary and All Saints Church, Great Budworth. The church is recorded in the National Heritage List for England as a designated Grade II listed building.  It was a Commissioners' church, having received a grant towards its construction from the Church Building Commission.

History

St Mark's was designed by George Gilbert Scott, and built between 1847 and 1848 at a cost of £1,550 (equivalent to £ in ).  A grant of £80 was given towards its construction by the Church Building Commission.

Architecture

The church is constructed in red sandstone, with a slate roof.  The architectural style is Decorated.  Its plan consists of a nave, a south porch, a chancel, and a north vestry.  On the ridge of the church is a bellcote surmounted by a weathervane.  Along the sides of the church are two two-light windows and a lancet window.  The east window has three lights, and the west window has two lights.  A broad buttress on the south side of the church contains a priest's door.  The porch is in timber.  Inside the church is a screen designed by Scott, part of which is in wood and part in iron.  There is stained glass in windows in the chancel and the south wall of the nave.

External features
The churchyard contains the war grave of a First World War soldier of the Cheshire Regiment.

See also

Listed buildings in Antrobus
List of new churches by George Gilbert Scott in Northern England
List of Commissioners' churches in Northeast and Northwest England

References

Church of England church buildings in Cheshire
Grade II listed churches in Cheshire
Churches completed in 1848
Diocese of Chester
19th-century Church of England church buildings
Gothic Revival church buildings in England
Gothic Revival architecture in Cheshire
Commissioners' church buildings